Amalie Grønbæk Thestrup (born 17 April 1995) is a Danish footballer who plays as a striker for Women's Super League club West Ham United on loan from PSV and has appeared for the Denmark women's national football team.

Career
She has also played for the Danish youth national teams, several times.

She made international debut on the Danish national team, on 4 March 2019 against China, at the 2020 Algarve Cup.

In July 2020, Thestrup signed for newly-relegated Championship club Liverpool. On 25 May 2021, she left Liverpool upon the expiry of her contract, having scored only four goals in 17 league appearances.

On January 2023, she joined West Ham United on loan from PSV for the remainder of the 2022/23 WSL season.

Honours
Brøndby IF
 Elitedivisionen: 2015, 2017
 Elitedivisionen runners-up: 2016
 Danish Cup: 2015, 2017

References

External links
 
 
 

1995 births
Living people
Danish women's footballers
Denmark women's international footballers
Brøndby IF (women) players
A.S. Roma (women) players
People from Gentofte Municipality
Women's association football forwards
Ballerup-Skovlunde Fodbold (women) players
Sportspeople from the Capital Region of Denmark
PSV (women) players